In the history of the Communist Party of the Soviet Union the Left-Right bloc was a failed attempt of vocal opposition to the politics of forced collectivization Joseph Stalin. Vissarion Lominadze and Sergey Syrtsov were recognized as its leaders. The name is derived from the accusation in factionism of the group created by joining of two groups: the one accused in "right opportunism" and allegedly headed by Syrtsov and another one accused of "leftism" and "half-Trotskyism" allegedly headed by Lominadze. In Western literature the case is known as the Syrtsov-Lominadze Affair.

History 
The issue was part on the agenda of the November 4, 1930 joint session of the Bureau of the Moscow Committee of the RKP(b) and the Presidium of the Central Control Commission  which considered the issue, "On the Factional Work of Comrades Syrtsov, Lominadze, Shatskin and Others." The resolution of the session declared, in part, that Syrtsov had "organized an underground factional center which included Nusinov, Kavraiskii, Galperin, Kurs, and others" and that Lominadze had "headed a persevered fractional group which included Shatskin, Reznik, and others."

There are opinions that in fact there was no such bloc, that while the dissenting views were public indeed, the whole affair was fabricated. E.g., Roy Medvedev expressed an opinion that Stalin learned some details of a conversation between Syrtsov and Lominadze. Pierre Broué wrote that Medvedev was wrong and there was indeed a bloc, because some of Trotsky's letters mentioned a real oppositional group between Lominadze, Jan Sten and Syrtsov.

Robert Davies notes that the case was part of the overall 1930 campaign against dissent (actual or potential) within the party. Davies also notes a peculiarity that unlike many other cases of Soviet political suppression, the campaign against Syrtsov and Lominadze in press did not associate them with "wreckers", nor with "imperialist forces" abroad.

Some of its members later joined a conspiratorial bloc with Leon Trotsky and other anti-Stalin politicians in 1932.

Footnotes

Factions in the Communist Party of the Soviet Union
Political repression in the Soviet Union
Soviet internal politics
1930 in the Soviet Union
1930 in politics